The Mandelbrot set is the set of complex numbers  for which the function  does not diverge to infinity when iterated from , i.e., for which the sequence , , etc., remains bounded in absolute value.

This set was first defined and drawn by Robert W. Brooks and Peter Matelski in 1978, as part of a study of Kleinian groups. Afterwards, in 1980,  Benoit Mandelbrot obtained high-quality visualizations of the set while working at IBM's Thomas J. Watson Research Center in Yorktown Heights, New York.

Images of the Mandelbrot set exhibit an elaborate and infinitely complicated boundary that reveals progressively ever-finer recursive detail at increasing magnifications; mathematically, one would say that the boundary of the Mandelbrot set is a fractal curve. The "style" of this recursive detail depends on the region of the set boundary being examined. Mandelbrot set images may be created by sampling the complex numbers and testing, for each sample point  whether the sequence  goes to infinity.

The Mandelbrot set has become popular outside mathematics both for its aesthetic appeal and as an example of a complex structure arising from the application of simple rules. It is one of the best-known examples of mathematical visualization,  mathematical beauty, and motif.

History

The Mandelbrot set has its origin in complex dynamics, a field first investigated by the French mathematicians Pierre Fatou and Gaston Julia at the beginning of the 20th century. This fractal was first defined and drawn in 1978 by Robert W. Brooks and Peter Matelski as part of a study of Kleinian groups. On 1 March 1980, at IBM's Thomas J. Watson Research Center in Yorktown Heights, New York, Benoit Mandelbrot first saw a visualization of the set.

Mandelbrot studied the parameter space of quadratic polynomials in an article that appeared in 1980. The mathematical study of the Mandelbrot set really began with work by the mathematicians Adrien Douady and John H. Hubbard (1985), who established many of its fundamental properties and named the set in honor of Mandelbrot for his influential work in fractal geometry.

The mathematicians Heinz-Otto Peitgen and Peter Richter became well known for promoting the set with photographs, books (1986), and an internationally touring exhibit of the German Goethe-Institut (1985).

The cover article of the August 1985 Scientific American introduced a wide audience to the algorithm for computing the Mandelbrot set. The cover was created by Peitgen, Richter and Saupe at the University of Bremen. The Mandelbrot set became prominent in the mid-1980s as a computer graphics demo, when personal computers became powerful enough to plot and display the set in high resolution.

The work of Douady and Hubbard coincided with a huge increase in interest in complex dynamics and abstract mathematics, and the study of the Mandelbrot set has been a centerpiece of this field ever since. An exhaustive list of all who have contributed to the understanding of this set since then is long but would include Jean-Christophe Yoccoz, Mitsuhiro Shishikura, Curt McMullen, John Milnor and Mikhail Lyubich.

Formal definition
The Mandelbrot set is the set of values of c in the complex plane for which the orbit of the critical point  under iteration of the quadratic map

remains bounded.

For example, for c = 1, the sequence is 0, 1, 2, 5, 26, ..., which tends to infinity, so 1 is not an element of the Mandelbrot set.

The Mandelbrot set can also be defined as the connectedness locus of the family of quadratic polynomials , the subset of the space of parameters  for which the Julia set of the corresponding polynomial forms a connected set. In the same way, the boundary of the Mandelbrot set can be defined as the bifurcation locus of this quadratic family, the subset of parameters near which the dynamic behavior of the polynomial (when it is iterated repeatedly) changes drastically.

Basic properties
The Mandelbrot set is a compact set, since it is closed and contained in the closed disk of radius 2 around the origin. More specifically, a point  belongs to the Mandelbrot set if and only if  for all . Since , it follows that , establishing that  will always be in the closed disk of radius 2 around the origin.

The parameters along this interval can be put in one-to-one correspondence with those of the real logistic family,

The correspondence is given by

In fact, this gives a correspondence between the entire parameter space of the logistic family and that of the Mandelbrot set.

Douady and Hubbard have shown that the Mandelbrot set is connected. In fact, they constructed an explicit conformal isomorphism between the complement of the Mandelbrot set and the complement of the closed unit disk. Mandelbrot had originally conjectured that the Mandelbrot set is disconnected. Upon further experiments, he revised his conjecture, deciding that  should be connected. There also exists a topological proof to the connectedness that was discovered in 2001 by Jeremy Kahn.

These rays can be used to study the Mandelbrot set in combinatorial terms and form the backbone of the Yoccoz parapuzzle.

As mentioned earlier in the article, the boundary of the Mandelbrot set is the bifurcation locus of the family of quadratic polynomials. In other words, the boundary of the Mandelbrot set is the set of all parameters  for which the dynamics of the quadratic map  exhibits sensitive dependence on  i.e., changes abruptly under arbitrarily small changes of  It can be constructed as the limit set of a sequence of plane algebraic curves, the Mandelbrot curves, of the general type known as polynomial lemniscates. The Mandelbrot curves are defined by setting , and then interpreting the set of points  in the complex plane as a curve in the real Cartesian plane of degree in x and y.  Each curve  is the mapping of an initial circle of radius 2 under .  These algebraic curves appear in images of the Mandelbrot set computed using the "escape time algorithm" mentioned below.

Other properties

Main cardioid and period bulbs

Upon looking at a picture of the Mandelbrot set, one immediately notices the large cardioid region in the center. This main cardioid
is the region of parameters  for which the map

has an attracting fixed point. It consists of all parameters of the form

To the left of the main cardioid, attached to it at the point , a circular bulb called the period-2 bulb is visible. The reason for the name is that the bulb consists of precisely those parameters  for which  has an attracting cycle of period 2. It is in fact the filled circle of radius 1/4 centered around −1.

More generally, for every positive integer , there are  circular bulbs tangent to the main cardioid called period-q bulbs (where  denotes the Euler phi function), which consist of parameters  for which  has an attracting cycle of period . More specifically, for each primitive th root of unity  (where ), there is one period-q bulb called the  bulb, which is tangent to the main cardioid at the parameter

and which contains parameters with -cycles having combinatorial rotation number . More precisely, the  periodic Fatou components containing the attracting cycle all touch at a common point (commonly called the -fixed point). If we label these components  in counterclockwise orientation, then  maps the component  to the component .

As we pass through the bifurcation parameter into the -bulb, the attracting fixed point turns into a repelling fixed point (the -fixed point), and the period-q cycle becomes attracting.

Hyperbolic components
All the bulbs we encountered in the previous section were interior components of the Mandelbrot set in which the maps  have an attracting periodic cycle. Such components are called hyperbolic components.

This problem, known as density of hyperbolicity, may be the most important open problem in the field of complex dynamics. Hypothetical non-hyperbolic components of the Mandelbrot set are often referred to as "queer" or ghost components.
For real quadratic polynomials, this question was answered positively in the 1990s independently by Lyubich and by Graczyk and Świątek. (Note that hyperbolic components intersecting the real axis correspond exactly to periodic windows in the Feigenbaum diagram. So this result states that such windows exist near every parameter in the diagram.)

Not every hyperbolic component can be reached by a sequence of direct bifurcations from the main cardioid of the Mandelbrot set. However, such a component can be reached by a sequence of direct bifurcations from the main cardioid of a little Mandelbrot copy (see below).

Each of the hyperbolic components has a center, which is a point c such that the inner Fatou domain for  has a super-attracting cycle—that is, that the attraction is infinite (see the image here). This means that the cycle contains the critical point 0, so that 0 is iterated back to itself after some iterations. We therefore have that  for some n. We can therefore construct the centers of the hyperbolic components by successively solving the equations . The number of new centers produced in each step is given by Sloane's .

Local connectivity
It is conjectured that the Mandelbrot set is locally connected. This famous conjecture is known as MLC (for Mandelbrot locally connected). By the work of Adrien Douady and John H. Hubbard, this conjecture would result in a simple abstract "pinched disk" model of the Mandelbrot set. In particular, it would imply the important hyperbolicity conjecture mentioned above.

The work of Jean-Christophe Yoccoz established local connectivity of the Mandelbrot set at all finitely renormalizable parameters; that is, roughly speaking those contained only in finitely many small Mandelbrot copies.

Self-similarity

The Mandelbrot set is self-similar under magnification in the neighborhoods of the Misiurewicz points. It is also conjectured to be self-similar around generalized Feigenbaum points (e.g., −1.401155 or −0.1528 + 1.0397i), in the sense of converging to a limit set.
The Mandelbrot set in general is not strictly self-similar but it is quasi-self-similar, as small slightly different versions of itself can be found at arbitrarily small scales. These little copies of the Mandelbrot set are all slightly different, mostly because of the thin threads connecting them to the main body of the set.

Further results
The Hausdorff dimension of the boundary of the Mandelbrot set equals 2 as determined by a result of Mitsuhiro Shishikura. The fact that this is greater (by a whole integer) than its topological dimension (which is 1) reflects the fractal nature of the Mandelbrot set boundary. In fact, Shishikura's result intuitively states that the Mandelbrot set boundary is so "wiggly" that it manages to locally fill up space as efficiently as a two-dimensional planar region. This opens up the potential possibility that the Mandelbrot set boundary, despite being a curve, has a nonzero area (or, more formally, has a positive planar Lebesgue measure). Whether or not this is actually the case remains an open problem today.

It has been shown that the generalized Mandelbrot set in higher-dimensional hypercomplex number spaces (i.e. when the power  of the iterated variable  tends to infinity) is convergent to the unit (-1)-sphere.

In the Blum–Shub–Smale model of real computation, the Mandelbrot set is not computable, but its complement is computably enumerable. However, many simple objects (e.g., the graph of exponentiation) are also not computable in the BSS model. At present, it is unknown whether the Mandelbrot set is computable in models of real computation based on computable analysis, which correspond more closely to the intuitive notion of "plotting the set by a computer". Hertling has shown that the Mandelbrot set is computable in this model if the hyperbolicity conjecture is true.

Relationship with Julia sets

As a consequence of the definition of the Mandelbrot set, there is a close correspondence between the geometry of the Mandelbrot set at a given point and the structure of the corresponding Julia set. For instance, a value of c belongs to the Mandelbrot set if the corresponding Julia set is connected. Thus, the Mandelbrot set may be seen as a map of the connected Julia sets.

This principle is exploited in virtually all deep results on the Mandelbrot set. For example, Shishikura proved that, for a dense set of parameters in the boundary of the Mandelbrot set, the Julia set has Hausdorff dimension two, and then transfers this information to the parameter plane. Similarly, Yoccoz first proved the local connectivity of Julia sets, before establishing it for the Mandelbrot set at the corresponding parameters. Adrien Douady eloquently summarizes this principle as:

Geometry

The part of the Mandelbrot set connected to the main cardioid at this bifurcation point is called the p/q-limb. Computer experiments suggest that the diameter of the limb tends to zero like . The best current estimate known is the Yoccoz-inequality, which states that the size tends to zero like .

A period-q limb will have  "antennae" at the top of its limb. We can thus determine the period of a given bulb by counting these antennas.

Pi in the Mandelbrot set 
For example, for  = 0.0000001 the number of iterations is 31415928 and the product is 3.1415928. In 2001, Aaron Klebanoff proved Boll's discovery.

Fibonacci sequence in the Mandelbrot set 
It can be shown that the Fibonacci sequence is located within the Mandelbrot set and that a relation exists between the main cardioid and the Farey Diagram. Upon mapping the main cardioid to a disk, one can notice that the amount of antennae that extends from the next largest Hyperbolic component, and that is located between the two previously selected components, follows suit with the Fibonacci sequence. The amount of antennae also correlates with the Farey Diagram and the denominator amounts within the corresponding fractional values, of which relate to the distance around the disk. Both portions of these fractional values themselves can be summed together after  to produce the location of the next Hyperbolic component within the sequence. Thus, the Fibonacci sequence of 1, 2, 3, 5, 8, 13, and 21 can be found within the Mandelbrot set.

Image gallery of a zoom sequence
The boundary of the Mandelbrot set shows more intricate detail the closer one looks or magnifies the image, usually called "zooming in". The following example of an image sequence zooming to a selected c value gives an impression of the infinite richness of different geometrical structures present in the Mandelbrot set boundary and explains some of their typical rules.

The magnification of the last image relative to the first one is about 1010 to 1. Relating to an ordinary computer monitor, it represents a section of a Mandelbrot set with a diameter of 4 million kilometers. Its border shows an astronomical number of different fractal structures.

The seahorse "body" is composed by 25 "spokes" consisting of two groups of 12 "spokes" each and one "spoke" connecting to the main cardioid. These two groups can be attributed by some kind of metamorphosis to the two "fingers" of the "upper hand" of the Mandelbrot set; therefore, the number of "spokes" increases from one "seahorse" to the next by 2; the "hub" is a so-called Misiurewicz point. Between the "upper part of the body" and the "tail" a distorted small copy of the Mandelbrot set called satellite may be recognized.

The islands in the third-to-last step seem to consist of infinitely many parts like Cantor sets, as is actually the case for the corresponding Julia set . However, they are connected by tiny structures, so that the whole represents a simply connected set. The tiny structures meet each other at a satellite in the center that is too small to be recognized at this magnification.

Inner structure
While the Mandelbrot set is typically rendered showing the outside boundary detail, structure within the bounded set can also be revealed.  For example, while calculating whether or not a given c value is bound or unbound, while it remains bound, the maximum value that this number reaches can be compared to the c value at that location.  If the sum of squares method is used, the calculated number would be max:(real^2 + imaginary^2) - c:(real^2 + imaginary^2).  The magnitude of this calculation can be rendered as a value on a gradient.

This produces results like the following, gradients with distinct edges and contours as the boundaries are approached.  The animations serve to highlight the gradient boundaries.

Generalizations

Multibrot sets
Multibrot sets are bounded sets found in the complex plane for members of the general monic univariate polynomial family of recursions

For an integer d, these sets are connectedness loci for the Julia sets built from the same formula. The full cubic connectedness locus has also been studied; here one considers the two-parameter recursion , whose two critical points are the complex square roots of the parameter k. A parameter is in the cubic connectedness locus if both critical points are stable. For general families of holomorphic functions, the boundary of the Mandelbrot set generalizes to the bifurcation locus, which is a natural object to study even when the connectedness locus is not useful.

The Multibrot set is obtained by varying the value of the exponent d. The article has a video that shows the development from d =  0 to 7, at which point there are 6 i.e.  lobes around the perimeter. In general, when d is a positive integer, the central region in each of these sets is always an epicycloid of  cusps. A similar development with negative integral exponents results in  clefts on the inside of a ring, where the main central region of the set is a hypocycloid of  cusps.

Higher dimensions
There is no perfect extension of the Mandelbrot set into 3D. This is because there is no 3D analogue of the complex numbers for it to iterate on. However, there is an extension of the complex numbers into 4 dimensions, called the quaternions, that creates a perfect extension of the Mandelbrot set and the Julia sets into 4 dimensions. These can then be either cross-sectioned or projected into a 3D structure. However, the quaternion (4-dimensional) Mandelbrot set is simply a solid of revolution of the 2-dimensional Mandelbrot set (in the j-k plane), and is therefore largely uninteresting to look at, as it does not have any of the properties that would be expected from a 4-dimensional fractal. Taking a 3-dimensional cross section at  results in a solid of revolution of the 2-dimensional Mandelbrot set around the real axis.

Other, non-analytic, mappings

Of particular interest is the tricorn fractal, the connectedness locus of the anti-holomorphic family

The tricorn (also sometimes called the Mandelbar) was encountered by Milnor in his study of parameter slices of real cubic polynomials. It is not locally connected. This property is inherited by the connectedness locus of real cubic polynomials.

Another non-analytic generalization is the Burning Ship fractal, which is obtained by iterating the following:

Computer drawings

There exist a multitude of various algorithms for plotting the Mandelbrot set via a computing device. Here, the most widely used and simplest algorithm will be demonstrated, namely, the naïve "escape time algorithm". In the escape time algorithm, a repeating calculation is performed for each x, y point in the plot area and based on the behavior of that calculation, a color is chosen for that pixel.

The x and y locations of each point are used as starting values in a repeating, or iterating calculation (described in detail below). The result of each iteration is used as the starting values for the next. The values are checked during each iteration to see whether they have reached a critical "escape" condition, or "bailout". If that condition is reached, the calculation is stopped, the pixel is drawn, and the next x, y point is examined.

The color of each point represents how quickly the values reached the escape point. Often black is used to show values that fail to escape before the iteration limit, and gradually brighter colors are used for points that escape. This gives a visual representation of how many cycles were required before reaching the escape condition.

To render such an image, the region of the complex plane we are considering is subdivided into a certain number of pixels. To color any such pixel, let  be the midpoint of that pixel. We now iterate the critical point 0 under , checking at each step whether the orbit point has a radius larger than 2. When this is the case, we know that  does not belong to the Mandelbrot set, and we color our pixel according to the number of iterations used to find out. Otherwise, we keep iterating up to a fixed number of steps, after which we decide that our parameter is "probably" in the Mandelbrot set, or at least very close to it, and color the pixel black.

In pseudocode, this algorithm would look as follows. The algorithm does not use complex numbers and manually simulates complex-number operations using two real numbers, for those who do not have a complex data type. The program may be simplified if the programming language includes complex-data-type operations.

 for each pixel (Px, Py) on the screen do
     x0 := scaled x coordinate of pixel (scaled to lie in the Mandelbrot X scale (-2.00, 0.47))
     y0 := scaled y coordinate of pixel (scaled to lie in the Mandelbrot Y scale (-1.12, 1.12))
     x := 0.0
     y := 0.0
     iteration := 0
     max_iteration := 1000
     while (x*x + y*y ≤ 2*2 AND iteration < max_iteration) do
         xtemp := x*x - y*y + x0
         y := 2*x*y + y0
         x := xtemp
         iteration := iteration + 1
     
     
     color := palette[iteration]
     plot(Px, Py, color)

 
 
 
and so, as can be seen in the pseudocode in the computation of x and y:
  and 

To get colorful images of the set, the assignment of a color to each value of the number of executed iterations can be made using one of a variety of functions (linear, exponential, etc.).

References in popular culture
The Mandelbrot set is widely considered the most popular fractal, and has been referenced several times in popular culture.
 The Jonathan Coulton song "Mandelbrot Set" is a tribute to both the fractal itself and to the man it is named after, Benoit Mandelbrot.
 The second book of the Mode series by Piers Anthony, Fractal Mode, describes a world that is a perfect 3D model of the set.
 The Arthur C. Clarke novel The Ghost from the Grand Banks features an artificial lake made to replicate the shape of the Mandelbrot set.
 Benoit Mandelbrot and the eponymous set were the subjects of the Google Doodle on 20 November 2020 (the late Benoit Mandelbrot's 96th birthday).
 The American rock band Heart has an image of a Mandelbrot set on the cover of their 2004 album, Jupiters Darling.
 The British black metal band Anaal Nathrakh uses an image resembling the Mandelbrot set on their Eschaton album cover art.
 The television series Dirk Gently's Holistic Detective Agency (2016) prominently features the Mandelbrot set in connection with the visions of the character Amanda. In the second season, her jacket has a large image of the fractal on the back.
 In Ian Stewart's 2001 book Flatterland, there is a character called the Mandelblot, who helps explain fractals to the characters and reader.

See also

 Buddhabrot
 Collatz fractal
 Fractint
 Gilbreath permutation
 Mandelbox
 Mandelbulb
 Menger sponge
 Newton fractal
 Orbit portrait
 Orbit trap
 Pickover stalk
 Plotting algorithms for the Mandelbrot set

References

Further reading
 (First appeared in 1990 as a Stony Brook IMS Preprint, available as arXiV:math.DS/9201272 )
 (includes a DVD featuring Arthur C. Clarke and David Gilmour)

External links

 
 Video: Mandelbrot fractal zoom to 6.066 e228
 Relatively simple explanation of the mathematical process, by Dr Holly Krieger, MIT
 Mandelbrot Viewer: Browser based Mandelbrot set renderer including a gallery with examples.
 Various algorithms for calculating the Mandelbrot set (on Rosetta Code)
 Fractal calculator written in Lua by Deyan Dobromiroiv, Sofia, Bulgaria

Fractals
Articles containing video clips
Articles with example pseudocode
Complex dynamics